Maybin Mwaba (born 8 November 1987) is a retired Zambian football midfielder.

References

1987 births
Living people
Zambian footballers
Zambia international footballers
Nchanga Rangers F.C. players
ZESCO United F.C. players
Association football midfielders